The International Association for Feminist Economics (IAFFE) is a non-profit international association dedicated to raising awareness and inquiry of feminist economics. It has approximately six hundred members in sixty-four countries.  The association publishes a quarterly journal entitled Feminist Economics. Since 1998 IAFFE has held NGO special consultative status.

The organization is made up of 'chapters' which conduct panel meetings alongside the meetings of other economic groups such as, the European Association for Evolutionary and Political Economy (EAEPE) and the American Economic Association (AEA).

History 
In 1990 Diana Strassmann organized a panel named, Can feminism find a home in economics? Members of the audience were invited specifically, by Jean Shackelford and April Aerni, to join a start-up network for economists which would be overtly feminist in outlook. In 1992 this network became the International Association for Feminist Economics (IAFFE) with Shackleford becoming their first president.

In 1998 IAFFE was made an NGO with special consultative status to the Economic and Social Council of the United Nations (ECOSOC).

By 2003 IAFFE had more than five hundred members from over thirty countries. The association's president from 2003 to 2004 was Lourdes Benería. Shahra Razavi paid tribute to Benería in a speech at the IAFFE conference in 2012 describing Benería's work as, "not only empirically grounded and conceptually informed, but also contributing to a feminist critique that is systemic and connected to a broader critique of capitalism".

IAFFE was awarded a grant of $1.5 million in 2010 from the Swedish International Development Agency (SIDA), to continue their work, including the publication of special issues of Feminist Economics. Since then the association has gone on to number six hundred members in sixty-four countries.

Chapters

European chapter 
At the same time as IAFFE was setting up, a separate group of women, including Edith Kuiper, in the Netherlands organized a conference on feminist perspectives on economic theory called Out of the Margins. The conference brought many like minded people together who continued to network with one another and be involved in groups and activism, sometimes involving the IAFFE. (Another small group of Dutch economists founded another organization named FENN, the Feminist Economics Network in the Netherlands). In 1998, at a second Amsterdam conference, arrangements were made to hold the first meeting of IAFFE European chapter.

The first official meeting of IAFFE Europe took place in Brussels in November 1998, there were twenty-five participants from ten countries and, as a result of the meeting, an e-mail list was created. Information about futures sessions and a report of the first meeting was sent to those interested, this led to more IAFFE panels (in 1999 and 2000) being organized for meetings of the European Association for Evolutionary and Political Economy (EAEPE).

The European chapter of IAFFE continued to meet and Ailsa McKay, professor of economics at Glasgow Caledonian University, was its chair until her death in March 2014.

Australian and New Zealand Association for Feminist Economics (ANZAFFE) 
The Out of the Margins conference resulted in a network of contacts being formed, one of these networks gradually became the Australian and New Zealand Association for Feminist Economics (ANZAFFE), a chapter of IAFFE. The chapter includes a small feminist economics group in Wellington, New Zealand led by Prue Hyman.

United States chapter 
The American chapter of IAFFE hold sessions at the American Economic Association's (AEA) annual meetings.

The Rhonda Williams Prize 
IAFFE offer a prize scholarship in memory of former associate editor of Feminist Economics (1994–1998), Rhonda Williams. In 2014 the amount awarded was $1,500 to be given out at their summer conference to allow underrepresented groups in IAFFE attend the conference and present a paper.

Award winners must demonstrate a commitment to one or more of the following issues: inequalities; interrelationships (racism, sexism, homophobia, and classism); and connections between scholarship and activism. Funding is provided by both Routledge and, Taylor & Francis.

Conferences 
IAFFE takes part in the Allied Social Science Associations (ASSA) annual conference every year. It also has its own annual conferences.

Grants

Association members

2020-21 Board of Directors 
This is list of who is sitting on the board of IAFFE.

 President - Radhika Balakrishnan
 President-Elect - Abena Oduro
 Executive Vice President and Treasurer - Shaianne Osterreich
 Executive Vice President and Secretary - Kate Bahn
 Editor, Feminist Economics - Diana Strassmann
 Past President - Cheryl Doss

Additional board members 

 Haroon Akram-Lodhi
 Alma Espino
 Valeria Esquivel
 Jayati Ghosh
 Heidi Hartmann
 James Heintz
 Lyn Ossome
 Lynda Pickbourn
 Rhonda V. Sharpe

Past presidents 
This is a list of presidents of the IAFFE.

 1993–1995 Jean Shackelford
 1995–1997 Marianne Ferber
 1997–1999 Myra Strober
 1999–2000 Barbara Bergmann
 2000–2001 Rhonda Sharp
 2001–2002 Jane Humphries
 2002–2003 Nancy Folbre
 2003–2004 Lourdes Benería
 2004–2005 Bina Agarwal
 2005–2006 Robin L. Bartlett
 2006–2007 Edith Kuiper
 2007–2008 Martha MacDonald
 2008–2009 Cecilia Conrad
 2009–2009 Susan Himmelweit
 2009–2010 Eudine Barriteau
 2010–2011 Stephanie Seguino
 2011–2012 Rosalba Todaro
 2012–2013 Agneta Stark
 2013–2014 Yana van der Meulen Rodgers
 2014–2015 Alicia Girón
 2015–2016 Şemsa Özar
 2016–2017 Joyce Jacobsen
 2018–2019 Naila Kabeer
 2019–2020 Cheryl Doss

Publications

Journals 
 Feminist Economics.

Books by IAFFE members

See also 
 American Economic Association (AEA)
 Capability approach
Critique of political economy
 Equality of autonomy
 European Association for Evolutionary Political Economy (EAEPE)
 Feminist economics - the subject
 Feminist Economics - the journal
 Human Development and Capability Association
 International Development Research Centre

References

External links 
 IAFFE website

Affirmative action
Amartya Sen
Autonomy
Homo economicus
Economics societies
Egalitarianism
Feminist economics
Identity politics
Organizations established in 1992
Social inequality